Koli Christians are a religious subgroup of the Koli people, known as East Indians, the indigenous people of the Seven Islands of Bombay and the Bombay metro area, which is now also called Mumbai (Bombay). The Koli Christians were of the Son Koli caste, before their conversion from Hinduism to Christianity, in the former Bom Bahia of Portuguese India.  Christian Kolis are also known as Thankar and Gaonkar Kolis in Maharashtra, where they played an important role in building churches and convents in the northern Konkan division of Maharashtra.

Culture and custom
In 1989, there were approximately 9,000 Koli Christians, most of whom were fishermen, like their Hindu counterparts. Koli Christians blend the customs and traditions of the Koli people with the beliefs of the Roman Catholic church. In accordance with Koli tradition, marriages among Koli Christians are typically arranged, and certain ceremonies are observed in common with Hindu Kolis, such as the Shakarpura (engagement ceremony), while Christian practices are also observed, including the conducting of the wedding in a church. Although cross cousin and first cousin marriage has been generally practiced among the Hindu Maharashtri Kolis, the Bombay East Indian Koli Christians are forbidden through catechism (instructions) on the Sacrament of Matrimony.

Most Koli Christians live in Koliwadas, where their social lives are overseen by a patil and his karbaris (councillors). Holding their position by right of inheritance, these people are collectively known as the jamat. The bulk of Koli Christians fish for a living, with their catches being taken to market in Mumbai by fishwives or agents.

Conversion 

The Kolis of the Konkan division in Maharashtra converted to Christianity during the Portuguese Indian era, and they proved very helpful during the wartime because they were experts in boat and warships building.

Titles 
 Patil: Christian Kolis who were landlords, nobles or men of influence bore the title of Patil. These were responsible for maintaining the religious practices and order in community of Koli Christians.
 Gaonpatil: The Gaonpatil is a common title among Christian Kolis who are responsible for maintaining religious activities and caste practices.

Distribution 
Christian Kolis are mostly found in the Mumbai, Colaba, Worli, Chimvai (Bandra), Madh, Uttan, Gorai, Bassain and Aghasi in Maharashtra. In Gorai, 85% population are Christian Kolis.

Beliefs 
The Christian Kolis follow or worship both Hindu deities and the Christian god. Christian Kolis also venerate the Hindu Koli goddess Ekvira in the Karla Caves and the deity Bhairava in Jejuri. Christian kolis dress up statues of Mary in their traditional Koli sarees.

Classification 
The Koli Christians of Maharashtra are classified as Other Backward Class (OBC) by the National Commission for Backward Classes and the Government of Maharashtra and Government of Goa.

See also 
 List of Koli people
 List of Koli states and clans
 Christian Brahmins
 Christian Cxatrias
 Religion in India

References

Citations

Sources

 
 
 

Indian Christians
Koli people